Painter is a surname. Notable people with the surname include:

Andrew Painter (disambiguation)
Curtis Painter (born 1985), American footballer
David Painter (disambiguation)
Erle V. Painter, (1881–1968), American chiropractic, athletic trainer of the New York Yankees
Gamaliel Painter (1742–1819), American politician
George Painter (1914–2005), British author and biographer of Marcel Proust
Ian Painter (born 1964), English footballer
Joe Painter (born 1965), British geographer & academic
John Painter (cricketer) (1856–1900), English cricketer
John Painter (supercentenarian) (1888–2001), American soldier & long survivor
John Mark Painter (born 1967), American musician
Kenneth Painter (1935–2016), British archaeologist
Kevin Painter (born 1967), British darts player
Kristin Painter, American novelist
Lance Painter (born 1967), British baseball coach
Marcos Painter (born 1986), English footballer
Matt Painter (born 1970), American basketball coach
Oskar Painter, Canadian physicist
Patrick Paniter or Painter (born c.1470), Scottish courtier
Patrick Painter (born 1954) American art dealer
Robbie Painter (born 1971), English footballer
Roy Painter (born c. 1930), British politician
Shankar Painter (1946–2020), Indian poet
Sidney Painter (1902–1960), American medievalist
Temple Painter (1933–2016), American harpsichordist and organist
Theophilus Painter (1889–1969), American zoologist
William Hunt Painter (1835–1910), English botanist
William Painter (author) (c. 1540–1594), English author
William Painter (inventor) (1838–1906), American

Occupational surnames
English-language surnames
English-language occupational surnames